The 2014 Supercopa MX was a two-legged Mexican football match-up which was played in July 2014 between the champion of the Apertura 2013 Copa MX, Monarcas Morelia, and the champion of the Clausura 2014 Copa MX, Tigres UANL. The winner of the 2014 Supercopa MX qualified for the 2015 Copa Libertadores first stage.

Match details

First leg

Second leg

See also
Apertura 2013 Copa MX
Clausura 2014 Copa MX

References

2014
2014–15 in Mexican football
Atlético Morelia matches
Tigres UANL matches